Patrick Joseph "Pat" Hickey (born 17 June 1945) is an Irish sports administrator. He was president of the Olympic Council of Ireland from 1988 until 2016, and also served on Olympic and judo bodies at European and global level.

Early and personal life
Hickey worked as an estate agent, qualifying at the Institute of Property Valuers. He is married, and as of 2015, his firm, Hickey Auctioneers, was run by his daughter and eldest son.

A 2nd dan black belt in judo, he represented Ireland internationally, and competed into his forties. He maintains his fitness, and in 2015 he was jogging several times weekly in Phoenix Park.

Sports administration
Hickey was president of the Irish Judo Association from 1979 until becoming Honorary Life President in 1989. He was elected to the executive committee of the Olympic Council of Ireland (OCI) in 1981 and was in successive Irish Olympic delegations from Los Angeles 1984. He became president of the OCI in 1989 on the recommendation of Lord Killanin, former president of the OCI and the International Olympic Committee (IOC). After the 1999  establishment of the Irish Sports Council (ISC), Hickey clashed with both the ISC and successive sports ministers over responsibility for high performance sport, until the Institute of Sport was established within the ISC. Hickey was re-elected president of the OCI for successive four-year terms, usually unopposed, and defeating Richard Burrows of the Irish Sailing Association 27–10 in 2001.  Hickey alleged Burrows' candidacy was an ISC attempt to oust him.

When the OCI hosted the 1991 assembly of the European Olympic Committees (EOC) Hickey took the opportunity to forge relations with the newly admitted National Olympic Committees of the post-Soviet states. Hickey became a member of the IOC in 1995. He became president of the EOC in 2006, commissioned a feasibility study for the European Games, and was instrumental in establishing the Games. Nick Cohen, a reporter with The Guardian, criticised Hickey for flattering undemocratic leaders of potential hosts of the inaugural 2015 Games: Alexander Lukashenko of Belarus and Ilham Aliyev of Azerbaijan.

2016 Summer Olympics

Hickey was due to step down as OCI president following the 2016 Olympics in Rio de Janeiro.  On 17 August 2016, he was arrested in Rio during the Games as part of an investigation into alleged illegal resale of Olympic tickets, facing charges of facilitating ticket touting, formation of a cartel and ambush or illicit marketing. He denied any wrongdoing, and stated he would "step aside temporarily" from all his Olympic positions until the matter was resolved.

Hickey was due to face trial in Brazil over his alleged role in the Olympic Council of Ireland (OCI) ticketing affair after a Rio de Janeiro judge accepted the charges made by a public prosecutor against him and nine others.
Public prosecutor Marcos Kac charged Hickey and nine others with ticket-touting, ambush marketing, theft, tax evasion, money-laundering and criminal association.
 Hickey was allowed his passport back in November 2016 for a bond payment of 410,000 Euros. The month after The Association of National Olympic Committees (ANOC) loaned the money to Mr Hickey so he could go back to Ireland. But in November 2017, the Brazilian Supreme Court suspended the case against Hickey and the other accused, all of whom deny any wrongdoing, in order to examine the merits of the prosecution case and of the Habeas Corpus request by lawyers for one of his co-accused, Kevin Mallon of THG Sports, after the lawyers had argued that they could not mount a proper defence as the prosecution had presented no evidence, and "nor was there clarity on his alleged involvement in any crime". It was not known how long this would take, and this was still unclear in June 2019 when Olympic Federation of Ireland President Sarah Keane expressed the hope that the International Olympic Committee's Ethics Commission would conclude its own investigation of the case before the 2020 Tokyo Olympics. In the meantime Hickey and others had been criticised for lack of cooperation by the subsequent Moran inquiry into the matter. Hickey officially resigned from the IOC on December 5, 2022.

References

External links
 Paul Kimmage: As he languishes in jail, how did Pat Hickey become the most hated man in Irish sport?

1945 births
Irish male judoka
Olympic Federation of Ireland officials
International Olympic Committee members
Irish people imprisoned abroad
Living people